Bioenergy is energy made from biomass, which consists of recently living (but now dead) organisms, mainly plants. Types of biomass commonly used for bioenergy include wood, food crops such as corn, energy crops and waste from forests, yards, or farms. The IPCC (Intergovernmental Panel on Climate Change) defines bioenergy as a renewable form of energy. Bioenergy can either mitigate (i.e. reduce) or increase greenhouse gas emissions. There is also agreement that local environmental impacts can be problematic.

Terminology 

Since biomass technically can be used as a fuel directly (e.g. wood logs), some people use the terms biomass and biofuel interchangeably. However, more often than not, the word biomass simply denotes the biological raw material the fuel is made of. On the other hand, the word biofuel is often reserved for liquid or gaseous fuels, used for transportation.

Input materials 

Wood and wood residues is the largest biomass energy source today. Wood can be used as a fuel directly or processed into pellet fuel or other forms of fuels. Other plants can also be used as fuel, for instance maize, switchgrass, miscanthus and bamboo. The main waste feedstocks are wood waste, agricultural waste, municipal solid waste, and manufacturing waste. Upgrading raw biomass to higher grade fuels can be achieved by different methods, broadly classified as thermal, chemical, or biochemical:

Thermal conversion processes use heat as the dominant mechanism to upgrade biomass into a better and more practical fuel. The basic alternatives are torrefaction, pyrolysis, and gasification, these are separated mainly by the extent to which the chemical reactions involved are allowed to proceed (mainly controlled by the availability of oxygen and conversion temperature).

Many chemical conversions are based on established coal-based processes, such as the Fischer-Tropsch synthesis. Like coal, biomass can be converted into multiple commodity chemicals.

Biochemical processes have developed in nature to break down the molecules of which biomass is composed, and many of these can be harnessed. In most cases, microorganisms are used to perform the conversion. The processes are called anaerobic digestion, fermentation, and composting.

Applications

Biomass for heating

Biofuel for transportation 
Based on the source of biomass, biofuels are classified broadly into two major categories, depending if food crops are used or not:

First-generation (or "conventional") biofuels are made from food sources grown on arable lands, such as sugarcane and corn. Sugars present in this biomass are fermented to produce bioethanol, an alcohol fuel which serves as an additive to gasoline, or in a fuel cell to produce electricity. Bioethanol is made by fermentation, mostly from carbohydrates produced in sugar or starch crops such as corn, sugarcane, or sweet sorghum. Bioethanol is widely used in the United States and in Brazil. Biodiesel is produced from the oils in for instance rapeseed or sugar beets and is the most common biofuel in Europe.

Second-generation biofuels (also called "advanced biofuels") utilize non-food-based biomass sources such as perennial energy crops and agricultural residues/waste. The feedstock used to make the fuels either grow on arable land but are byproducts of the main crop, or they are grown on marginal land. Waste from industry, agriculture, forestry and households can also be used for second-generation biofuels, using e.g. anaerobic digestion to produce biogas, gasification to produce syngas or by direct combustion. Cellulosic biomass, derived from non-food sources, such as trees and grasses, is being developed as a feedstock for ethanol production, and biodiesel can be produced from left-over food products like vegetable oils and animal fats.

Production of liquid fuels 

 Biomass to liquid

 Bioconversion of biomass to mixed alcohol fuels

Comparison with other renewable energy types

Land requirement 
The surface power production densities of a crop will determine how much land is required for production. The average lifecycle surface power densities for biomass, wind, hydro and solar power production are 0.30 W/m2, 1 W/m2, 3 W/m2 and 5 W/m2, respectively (power in the form of heat for biomass, and electricity for wind, hydro and solar). Lifecycle surface power density includes land used by all supporting infrastructure, manufacturing, mining/harvesting and decommissioning. 

Another estimate puts the values at 0.08 W/m2 for biomass, 0.14 W/m2 for hydro, 1.84 W/m2 for wind, and 6.63 W/m2 for solar (median values, with none of the renewable sources exceeding 10 W/m2).

Related technologies

Bioenergy with carbon capture and storage (BECCS) 
Carbon capture and storage technology can be used to capture emissions from bioenergy power plants. This process is known as bioenergy with carbon capture and storage (BECCS) and can result in net carbon dioxide removal from the atmosphere. However, BECCS can also result in net positive emissions depending on how the biomass material is grown, harvested, and transported. Deployment of BECCS at scales described in some climate change mitigation pathways would require converting large amounts of cropland.

Climate and sustainability aspects

Environmental impacts 
Bioenergy can either mitigate (i.e. reduce) or increase greenhouse gas emissions. There is also agreement that local environmental impacts can be problematic. For example, increased biomass demand can create significant social and environmental pressure in the locations where the biomass is produced. The impact is primarily related to the low surface power density of biomass. The low surface power density has the effect that much larger land areas are needed in order to produce the same amount of energy, compared to for instance fossil fuels.

Long-distance transport of biomass have been criticised as wasteful and unsustainable, and there have been protests against forest biomass export in Sweden and Canada.

Scale and future trends 
Generally, bioenergy expansion fell by 50% in 2020. China and Europe are the only two regions that reported significant expansion in 2020, adding 2 GW and 1.2 GW of bioenergy capacity, respectively.

Almost all available sawmill residue is already being utilized for pellet production, so there is no room for expansion. For the bioenergy sector to significantly expand in the future, more of the harvested pulpwood must go to pellet mills. However, the harvest of pulpwood (tree thinnings) removes the possibility for these trees to grow old and therefore maximize their carbon holding capacity. Compared to pulpwood, sawmill residues have lower net emissions: "Some types of biomass feedstock can be carbon-neutral, at least over a period of a few years, including in particular sawmill residues. These are wastes from other forest operations that imply no additional harvesting, and if otherwise burnt as waste or left to rot would release carbon to the atmosphere in any case."

By country

See also

 Biochar
 Biomass to liquid
 Biorefinery
 European Biomass Association

References

Sources

 
 
 
 
 
 
 
 
 
 
 
 

 
Biofuels